Dreyer & Reinbold Racing is an automotive racing organization that competes in the IndyCar Series and Nitro Rallycross. The team is owned by Indianapolis BMW, Infiniti, Volkswagen, MINI, and Subaru dealer Dennis Reinbold.

Off the track, Dreyer & Reinbold Racing (DRR) have spent thousands of hours as the national spokesperson & advocate for "Racing for Kids," a national youth charitable foundation. On behalf of "Racing for Kids," DRR has visited more than 20,000 children in over 400 hospitals worldwide and raised nearly $5 million for local children's health initiatives.

IndyCar history

2000–2006
Founded in 2000, DRR was one of the few teams that consistently ran the Infiniti engine until they left the series, then switched to Chevrolet and finally to Honda in 2005. When Buhl retired from the cockpit in 2004, he placed Felipe Giaffone in the cockpit, followed by Roger Yasukawa with financial backing from Honda. With Honda backing gone for 2006, some doubted if the team would continue, as Buhl had consistently stated that if running the team did not make financial sense, he would shut it down. However, sponsorship was found and the team named 2000 series champion Buddy Lazier their primary driver. In 2002 the team ran a second car for Sarah Fisher, who became the first woman in North American motorsports history to win the pole position for a major-league open-wheel race, earning the pole at Kentucky Speedway. In the 2006 Indianapolis 500, the team's second car was driven by Al Unser Jr.

The team's only win came in their debut race, 2000 IRL season opener at Walt Disney World Speedway when Buhl stunned the series with a win from the 22nd starting position. In 2006 the team scored their best finish in years when Ryan Briscoe showed a great turn of speed in the wet at Watkins Glen International to get on the podium. During that time, other good results in the season were few and far between.

2007–2009
For 2007, the team recruited two ex-Fernandez Racing engineers and added a new sponsor. On January 31, 2007, 2004 Indianapolis 500 winner Buddy Rice and  Sarah Fisher would drive for the team.  Rice brought in respectable performances, finishing 9th in points with three top-five finishes. Fisher struggled to 17th place in points after playing second fiddle to the "A Team" often being given less than par equipment.  Fisher announced in late 2007 that she would leave the team due to a lack of commitment from the team to her efforts.

Rice returned to the team in 2008 while the team's second car was shared by Milka Duno and Townsend Bell, with all three drivers competing in the 2008 Indianapolis 500. Both Rice and Bell finished in the top-10 (8th and 10th respectively) while Duno finished 19th in the race. Rice finished 16th in points with a best finish of fourth at Watkins Glen.

2009 saw Dreyer & Reinbold bring on a completely new driver lineup from 2008. Joining the team full-time was British rookie Mike Conway, who most had previously competed in the GP2 Series. A second full-time entry was shared between Darren Manning (two races), Milka Duno, and Tomas Scheckter. In addition, Roger Yasukawa also returned to the team for the race at Twin Ring Motegi. The team also fielded cars for Richard Petty Motorsports driven by John Andretti and for Kingdom Racing and driver Davey Hamilton in the 2009 Indianapolis 500. The cars of Duno, Andretti, and Conway all struggled to qualify but made the field on bump day, the final day of qualifications. Conway, Andretti, and Duno were the last-placed cars running at the finish in the 18th, 19th, and 20th positions respectively. Throughout the rest of the season, Conway struggled for consistency, only finishing nine of the seventeen races, but was fast at times on the road courses, finishing on the podium in third at Infineon Raceway.

2010–2011
On February 2, 2010 it was announced that Justin Wilson would be joining Dreyer & Reinbold Racing for the 2010 IndyCar season in the No. 22 Z-Line Designs car.  Wilson was to be partnered throughout the season by returning driver Mike Conway.
For the opening race in Brazil they were joined by Ana Beatriz. For the 94th running of the Indianapolis 500 the team was expanded to run four cars for Tomas Scheckter and Ana Beatriz.  After Conway was sidelined for an accident in the closing stages of the Indy 500, Wilson was partnered by Tomas Scheckter, Graham Rahal and Paul Tracy. It was announced that he will be joined by J. R. Hildebrand who will make his Indycar debut at Mid-Ohio.
The Toronto event was Wilson's breakthrough event of the season, after being in the top two in each of the three practice sessions, he dominated qualifying. Wilson made it to the Firestone Fast Six shootout without using a single set of the faster red-walled (alternate compound) tires, and easily took the pole for the race after posting a record lap time of 1:00.2710s. Wilson went on to lead much of the race, however after losing grip coming off of turn 11 on a restart late in the race, his car spun and relinquished the lead to Will Power. Even after Wilson found himself pointing the wrong way in turn 8, he was able to rebound to a seventh-place finish.

After healing, Conway left DRR for Andretti Autosport  for the 2011 IndyCar season and was replaced by rookie Ana Beatriz and her sponsor Petroleo Ipiranga.  On 11 November 2010 an announcement was made confirming Wilson would remain with Dreyer & Reinbold for a second year.

2012–2013
On November 17, 2011, Dreyer & Reinbold Racing and Group Lotus PLC announced that DRR would serve as a Lotus factory partner team.  Additionally, the historic auto manufacturer provided DRR entries with its new Lotus IndyCar V-6 racing engine for the 2012 IndyCar season. On January 17, 2012 the team announced Oriol Servia as the team's full-time entry 

On April 23, Dreyer & Reinbold and Lotus mutually agreed to end their existing engine contract. Subsequently, on May 7, the team announced a strategic alliance with Panther Racing to provide technical support as well as the use of the second Chevrolet engine contract held by Panther. The team's performance dramatically improved, with back-to-back top-5 finishes at Indy and Detroit. Servia would finish the season with 3 more top 10s, eventually finishing 13th in points.

Dreyer & Reinbold Racing continued their partnership with Panther Racing for the 2013 season with driver Oriol Servia, however, the team decided to withdraw from the 2013 season after the Indianapolis 500 due to lack of sponsorship. The decision did not affect Panther Racing.

2014–present: Part-time team

After the 2013 Indianapolis 500, the team cut its staff and pulled out of IndyCar competition due to losing its primary sponsorship. The team made its return in the 2014 Indianapolis 500 with the help of Kingdom Racing with driver Sage Karam. Despite starting 31st, Karam would finish 9th. Townsend Bell was the Dreyer & Reinbold Kingdom Racing driver in the 2015 Indianapolis 500, finishing 14th. Sage Karam returned for the 2016 Indianapolis 500, crashing midway through the race.

In 2017, Karam drove for Dreyer & Reinbold Kingdom Racing at the Indianapolis 500, retiring with mechanical problems. In addition, Reinbold became a technical partner of Harding Racing, who entered Gabby Chaves at the three 500 milers.

In 2018 and 2019, Dreyer & Reinbold entered both Karam and J. R. Hildebrand with their best finish being 11th by Hildebrand in 2018.

On January 7, 2020, Dreyer & Reinbold announced that they would be expanding their race schedule to at least four races. These races included the Firestone Grand Prix of St. Petersburg, GMR Grand Prix, Indianapolis 500, and Honda Indy Toronto. Karam drove all four races while Hildebrand returned for the 500.

Rallycross
Dreyer & Reinbold Racing debuted in rallycross in 2016 by entering the Global RallyCross Championship, where Cabot Bigham was the GRC Lites champion. In 2017, Christian Brooks finished second and Travis PeCoy finished third. The team switched to the new Americas Rallycross Championship in 2018, where Christian Brooks was runner-up in the ARX2 class. In 2021, Cole Keatts was runner-up and Conner Martell was third, meanwhile Sage Karam claimed a win and four runner-up finishes in a part-time ARX2 entry.

In 2021, DRR signed a partnership with KYB EKS JC to compete in Nitro Rallycross. For the 2022–23 season, the team allied with JC Raceteknik and expanded to a four-car program in NRX's Group E class.

Drivers
 John Andretti (2009)
 Townsend Bell (2008, 2015)
 Ana Beatriz (2010–2011)
 Ryan Briscoe (2006)
 Jeff Bucknum (2005)
 Robbie Buhl (2000–2004)
 Mike Conway (2009–2010)
 Milka Duno (2008–2009)
 Santino Ferrucci (2022–present)
 Sarah Fisher (2002–2003, 2006–2007)
 Felipe Giaffone (2004)
 Memo Gidley (2002)
 Davey Hamilton (2009, 2011)
 J. R. Hildebrand (2010, 2018–2019)
 Sage Karam (2014; 2016–present)
 Steve Knapp (2000)
 Buddy Lazier (2004, 2006)
 Darren Manning (2009)
 Simon Pagenaud (2011)
 Giorgio Pantano (2011)
 Graham Rahal (2010)
 Buddy Rice (2007–2008)
 Tomas Scheckter (2009–2010)
 Oriol Servià (2012–2013)
 Paul Tracy (2010–2011)
 Al Unser Jr. (2006)
 Justin Wilson (2010–2011)
 Roger Yasukawa (2005, 2007, 2009)

Racing results

Complete Indycar results
(key)

 Non-points-paying, exhibition race.
 In conjunction with Richard Petty Motorsports.
 In conjunction with Kingdom Racing.
The final race at Las Vegas was abandoned after Dan Wheldon died from injuries sustained in a 15-car crash on lap 11.
 In conjunction with Panther Racing.

IndyCar win

Complete Global RallyCross results
(key)

GRC Lites

Complete Americas Rallycross results
(key)

ARX2

Complete Nitro RallyCross results

Supercar

NEXT

Group E

References

External links
DRR Official Website
DRR Official Facebook Page
DRR Official Twitter
IZOD IndyCar Series Team Page

IndyCar Series teams
American auto racing teams
Carmel, Indiana
Global RallyCross Championship teams
Auto racing teams established in 2000